Alexander Belyakov may refer to:

 Alexander Semyonovich Belyakov (born 1945), Russian politician
 Alexander Vasilyevich Belyakov (1897–1982), Soviet flight navigator
 Aleksandr Belyakov (born 1962), Soviet luger